General elections were held in the Democratic Republic of the Congo on 30 December 2018, to determine a successor to President Joseph Kabila, as well as for the 500 seats of the National Assembly and the 715 elected seats of the 26 provincial assemblies. Félix Tshisekedi (UDPS) won with 38.6% of the vote, defeating another opposition candidate, Martin Fayulu, and Emmanuel Ramazani Shadary, backed by the ruling party PPRD. Fayulu alleged that the vote was rigged against him in a deal made by Tshisekedi and outgoing President Kabila, challenging the result in the DRC's Constitutional Court. Different election observers, including those from the country's Roman Catholic Church, also cast doubt on the official result. Nonetheless on 20 January the Court rejected his appeal and declared Tshisekedi as the winner. Parties supporting President Kabila won the majority of seats in the National Assembly. Félix Tshisekedi was sworn in as the 5th President of the Democratic Republic of the Congo on 24 January 2019, making it the first peaceful transition of power in the country since it became independent from Belgium in 1960.

According to the constitution, the second and final term of President Kabila expired on 20 December 2016. General elections were originally scheduled for 27 November 2016, but were delayed with a promise to hold them by the end of 2017. This promise was subsequently broken, but after both international and internal pressure the elections were finally scheduled for 23 December 2018. They were, however, postponed for a week on 30 December 2018 due to a fire in the electoral commission's warehouse in Kinshasa destroying 8,000 electronic voting machines.

Incumbent President Kabila was constitutionally ineligible for a third term. He and his party, the People's Party for Reconstruction and Democracy, supported the candidacy of Emmanuel Ramazani Shadary, the former Minister of the Interior, who formally ran as an independent candidate. In opposition to Shadary's candidacy, seven opposition leaders, including Jean-Pierre Bemba and Moïse Katumbi, nominated Martin Fayulu as their candidate for president. However, Félix Tshisekedi and Vital Kamerhe soon after broke this agreement and agreed that Tshisekedi should run for president while Kamerhe would serve as his campaign manager and become Prime Minister if he won. They also agreed that Tshisekedi and his party will back a candidate from Kamerhe's Union for the Congolese Nation in the 2023 presidential elections.

Preliminary results were scheduled to be announced on 6 January 2019, with the final result on 15 January and the inauguration of the next president on 18 January. However, it was later announced on 5 January that the publication of preliminary results would be delayed, as less than half of the votes have been obtained by the election commission. On 10 January the election commission declared Félix Tshisekedi, leader of the Union for Democracy and Social Progress opposition party, as the winner of the election. Martin Fayulu, who came in second, has claimed that the election was rigged and that he will challenge the result in the DRC's Constitutional Court. The country's influential Roman Catholic Church, which deployed 40,000 election monitors, has also said the official result does not align with its observations, which place Fayulu as the winner. On 12 January it became known that parties supporting Joseph Kabila won the majority of seats in the National Assembly. The Constitutional Court announced on January 14 that it would review Fayulu's appeal of the result, and would make a ruling on January 19. On January 19, the Constitutional Court rejected Fayulu's challenge of the election results, upholding Tshisekedi's victory. Fayulu claims to be the "legitimate" president and has called for protests.

While Tshisekedi had won the election, parties aligned with Kabila secured a majority in the National Assembly and later in the Senate during the March 2019 Senate election. Because of this Tshisekedi's ability to implement policies or appoint a new Prime Minister were limited, and while negotiations have been ongoing to form a new government the President has been working with the former cabinet of Kabila. It was not until 20 May 2019 that he appointed Kabila ally and career bureaucrat Sylvestre Ilunga as his designate for Prime Minister. The parliamentary majority faction and President Tshisekedi came to an agreement on forming a new government by July 27, 2019, choosing the 65 members of the new cabinet. Out of those, 42 posts went to Common Front for Congo-aligned candidates, while 23 went to the Heading for Change coalition (Tshisekedi's alliance). The new Ilunga government formally took office in late August 2019.

Background
On 29 September 2016, the Independent National Electoral Commission (CENI) announced that the elections would not be held until early 2018. According to CENI's vice president, the commission "hasn't called elections in 2016 because the number of voters isn't known." The announcement came ten days after deadly protests against Kabila in Kinshasa saw 17 people killed. The opposition alleged that Kabila intentionally delayed the elections to remain in power.

An agreement reached with the opposition in December 2016 allowed Kabila to stay in office with a requirement to hold elections by the end of 2017. However, on 7 July 2017, CENI President Corneille Nangaa said it would not be possible to organize presidential elections by the end of the year. Opposition leader Felix Tshisekedi condemned the announcement on Twitter, saying Nangaa had "declared war on the Congolese people."

In November 2017 CENI announced that elections will be held in December 2018, after previously claiming earlier that month that elections could not be held until April 2019 due to the difficulties of registering voters in a country with underdeveloped infrastructure. Prime Minister Bruno Tshibala confirmed in March 2018 that the election will occur in December 2018.

According to the UN a total of 47 people had been killed at protests against President Kabila during this period, which occurred throughout 2017 and into 2018.

According to Human Rights Watch, government security forces used live rounds to disperse crowds of opposition supporters throughout August 2018, stating that the total death toll by then since 2015 was 300 people. HRW also documented attempts by the Congolese government to persecute members of the opposition, such as banning Moïse Katumbi from entering the country and forcefully dispersing a rally in support of Jean-Pierre Bemba.

In late December, the government further delayed voting in three cities until 31 March 2019. Those include Beni and Butembo in North Kivu province, due to the 2018 Ebola outbreak as well as the ongoing military conflict, and Yumbi in the western Mai-Ndombe province, where about 900 people were killed throughout December by inter-ethnic violence. In all other regions it will still take place as scheduled on 30 December. This was criticized as these regions are known as opposition strongholds.

Electoral system

According to Article 71 of the DRC Constitution, the President of the Democratic Republic of the Congo is elected by plurality vote in one round. Article 72 specifies that the requirements to stand as a candidate for the presidency include being a Congolese citizen and at least thirty years old.

Article 101 of the Constitution provides the basis for electing a National Assembly. The 500 members of the National Assembly are elected by two methods; in 2018, 62 were elected from single-member constituencies using first-past-the-post voting, and 438 were elected from multi-member constituencies by open list proportional representation, with seats allocated using the largest remainder method.

For the first time, electronic voting machines were used in a Congolese election. This has raised concerns about vote-rigging, particularly after a warehouse fire in Kinshasa destroyed 8,000 voting machines, which represent more than two-thirds of the voting machines that had been planned to be used in the city.

Candidates
In total, 21 candidates were approved for the presidential contest, and some 34,900 candidates were approved to run for the 500 national and 715 provincial assembly seats.
 
On 25 May 2018, businessman and former governor of Katanga Province Moïse Katumbi discussed with fellow opposition presidential candidate Félix Tshisekedi, son of the late opposition leader Etienne Tshisekedi, at the Atlantic Council about fielding a single opposition candidate. In early September 2018, he again called on the opposition to unite behind a single candidate.

As of August 2018, the country's Independent National Electoral Commission was reviewing candidates. A preliminary list of candidates, including 25 names, was published on 10 August 2018. Another list was published on 24 August, and the final one was published on 19 September.

Vital Kamerhe, government minister and parliamentary speaker, Union for the Congolese Nation leader.
Emmanuel Ramazani Shadary, former governor of Maniema Province and Interior Minister.
Félix Tshisekedi, opposition leader in the Union for Democracy and Social Progress and son of Etienne Tshisekedi.
Martin Fayulu supported by five opposition leaders including Jean-Pierre Bemba and Moïse Katumbi.

On 3 September, the Constitutional Court of the DRC upheld the national election commission's decision to ban six potential candidates from taking part in the election, including opposition leader Jean-Pierre Bemba.

Disqualified candidates
Samy Badibanga, former Prime Minister.
Jean-Pierre Bemba, former vice president and rebel leader.
Antoine Gizenga, 93-year-old former associate of Patrice Lumumba and former Prime Minister of the DRC under Kabila.
Moïse Katumbi, former Governor of Katanga Province. Katumbi has been purposely prevented from running because he has been sentenced in absentia to three years in prison for real-estate fraud.
Adolphe Muzito, former Prime Minister.
Bruno Tshibala, incumbent Prime Minister since 2017.

Opinion polls
Opinion polling is rare in the Democratic Republic of the Congo due to poor roads and lack of electricity. Nevertheless, the Congo Research Group (CRG) released a poll in October 2016 of 7,545 respondents in the country's 26 provinces. The poll found that 33% would vote for Katumbi, 18% for Etienne Tshisekedi, and 7.8% for Kabila.

A May 2017 poll of 7,500 respondents carried out by CRG/BERCI found that 38% would vote for Katumbi, 10% for Kabila, 5% each for Félix Tshisekedi, Vital Kamerhe and Jean-Pierre Bemba, 24% for other candidates, and 13% would not vote.

A March 2018 poll carried out by the CRG showed Katumbi obtaining 26%, Tshisekedi with 14%, Adolphe Muzito and Kamerhe tied at 9%, Kabila with 7%, and Augustin Mataya Ponyo and Aubin Minaku with 3% each.

A June 2018 Top Congo FM poll amongst opposition supporters showed Katumbi winning 54% of the opposition's vote, with Kamerhe at 34%, Bemba at 7%, and Tshisekedi at 5%.

In October 2018, the Congo Research Group released a poll that showed Tshisekedi winning 36% of the overall vote, with Kamerhe winning 17%, Shadary winning 16%, and Fayulu winning 8%, with 5% undecided or not voting. The remaining votes went to minor candidates.

Post-voting process
On the afternoon of 31 December 2018, the NetBlocks internet observatory reported regional internet disruptions in Kinshasa and Lubumbashi and the subsequent loss of connectivity across the DRC. The signal of Radio France Internationale, the country's most popular news source, was also blocked with a spokesman stating that the restrictions were implemented by Congolese authorities to prevent the spread of "fictitious results" published on social media and maintain order. The following day, representatives of the U.S., European Union, Swiss and Canadian missions in Kinshasa urged the DRC to restore Internet access.

On 2 January 2019, the Southern African Development Community (SADC) and African Union (AU) observation missions stated that the voting went "relatively well" and was peaceful, despite the logistical problems in the DRC.

The Catholic Church in the DRC, which deployed 40,000 election observers, announced on 3 January that by their observations it was clear who the winner of the election was.  A government spokesman condemned the Church's statement as "irresponsible and anarchic." Western diplomatic sources speaking with Church officials reported that they identified Martin Fayulu as the winner with 60% of the votes., However, Rev. Donatien Nshole, the church's secretary general, later retracted the church's allegations following a meeting with Kabila on 8 January, claiming that "we said there was a winner but we did not mention any name nor give any figures." Nshole also said that the church now would trust Kabila to lead any transition of power, claiming "he insisted on the fact that he wants to maintain peace and unity...we want the same."

On 4 January, United States President Donald Trump deployed 80 U.S. troops to the nearby country of Gabon to stand by in case violence broke in the DRC over the election results. On 9 January, the U.S. embassy in Kinshasa warned American citizens to leave the country due to possible election-related violence.

On 5 January, election commission chairman Cornielle Nangaa announced that preliminary results would not be announced on the scheduled date of 6 January, as the commission had only received less than half of the ballots. The following day this was confirmed and no date was given for the publication of the preliminary results, which was criticized by members of the opposition. On 8 January, Kabila adviser Kikaya Bin Karubi denied an allegation made by two aides of Felix Tshisekedi which claimed that Tshisekedi was the presumed winner and that Kabila officials had been meeting with aides of Tshisekedi since the end of the election so Kabila would hand power to Tshisekedi.

Police in anti-riot gear were deployed in front of the electoral commission headquarters in Kinshasa on 9 January. That same day, South African President Cyril Ramaphosa and other members of SADC urged the Congolese government to finalize the results quickly.

Announcement of results
In the early morning of the following day, 10 January 2019, after reading the results of over 700 candidacies for provincial elections from across the country, the commission announced Felix Tshisekedi as the winner of the presidential vote. Barnabé Kikaya bin Karubi, an advisor to Joseph Kabila, had said that the President accepted the loss of the ruling party candidate Emmanuel Shadary. Tshisekedi vowed to become "the president of all DR Congolese." On 12 January, it became known that the majority of seats in the National Assembly were won by parties supporting Kabila. The Céni announced the names of the winning candidates, as well as the total of votes on the national level, but no further info. The announcement, initially scheduled for past the presidential election's appeal and oath, took place while the votes were still being compiled all over the country.

Results

President

National Assembly

Aftermath

Accusations of fraud
Second-place candidate Martin Fayulu claimed that the results were rigged later that day, stating "In 2006, Jean-Pierre Bemba's victory was stolen, in 2011, Étienne Tshisekedi's victory was stolen. In 2018 victory won't be stolen from Martin Fayulu." He also said he believes that President-elect Félix Tshisekedi and President Joseph Kabila made a secret agreement. According to foreign diplomatic sources, the Catholic Church had claimed that Fayulu was the winner, and both the SADC and African Union observation missions had also believed him to have been the winner. The Catholic Church in the DRC made a statement questioning the result as well, stating that it did not align with their findings. Tshisekedi denied making any power-sharing agreement with Kabila or his ruling party. Fayulu told the BBC that he will challenge the result in the Constitutional Court.

On 11 January, Fayulu claimed he received 62% of the vote and said he would challenge the result in the country's Constitutional Court. The Court could confirm Tshisekedi, order a recount, or cancel the results and call for new elections. But Fayulu admitted that he did not believe he would have any success, saying the court is "composed of Kabila's people." He also claimed that "Felix Tshisekedi has been nominated by Mr Kabila to perpetuate the Kabila regime. Because today the boss is Kabila." Tshisekedi's spokesman denied that there was any deal between them. Fayulu officially filed a challenge to the results on 12 January.

A joint investigation by the Financial Times and Radio France Internationale appeared to reveal that massive fraud occurred during the election. FT claimed on 15 January that its analysis of two separate collections of voting data, representing 86% of votes cast, show that Fayulu won the election with 59.4% of the vote while Tshisekedi and Shadary both got about 19%.

Protests
Four people—two police officers and two civilians—were killed in the western city of Kikwit during protests. The following day, 11 January, at least one protester was killed in Goma. There were also reports of protests in Kisangani and Mbandaka. More civilian and police casualties were reported as protests increased across the country, and thousands of military and Republican Guard troops were deployed to maintain order.

On 18 January, the UN human rights office has said that 34 people have been killed, 59 wounded, and 241 arbitrarily arrested since the announcement of the provisional results on 10 January.

International reactions
The governments of France and Belgium also issued statements questioning the official result. French Foreign Minister Jean-Yves Le Drian claimed that Fayulu was expected to be declared the winner. Belgian Foreign Minister Didier Reynders also doubted the result, saying that Belgium would use its temporary UN Security Council seat to investigate the situation. British Foreign Secretary Jeremy Hunt said he was "very concerned about discrepancies" in the results. In an official statement, Secretary-General of the United Nations António Guterres urged all parties to "refrain from violence" and "live up to their responsibility in preserving stability." African Union leader Moussa Faki said that any disputes should be "resolved peacefully, by turning to the relevant laws". The Southern African Development Community (SADC) called for the creation of a national unity government in DR Congo, a negotiated settlement by factions representing Kabila, Tshisekedi, and Fayulu, on January 13. The organisation also called for a vote recount.

The United Nations Security Council issued a statement drafted by the French delegation urging all sides to respect the outcome of the vote on 15 January.

Representatives of Russia and China stated that they oppose foreign interference in the DRC election.

A number of African Union heads of state and government met in the Ethiopian capital Addis Ababa on 17 January, issuing a statement that the organization had "serious doubts" about the provisional results and calling on the Congolese government to delay the release of the final results. The AU also stated that it would send a delegation to the DRC with "the view to reaching a consensus on a way out of the post-electoral crisis." The delegation would include AU commission head Moussa Faki and AU chairman, the President of Rwanda, Paul Kagame.

The Congolese government rejected the AU's appeal to delay that announcement of the final results on 18 January, and that the announcement will be made after the Constitutional Court makes a decision. Government spokesman Lambert Mende stated that "I do not think anyone has the right to tell the court what to do. I am not under the impression (the AU) fully understands Congo's judicial process."

After the Constitutional Court ruling upholding Tshisekedi's victory on 20 January, Kenyan President Uhuru Kenyatta and South Africa President Cyril Ramaphosa both sent their congratulations to Tshisekedi and recognized him as the next President. AU spokeswoman Ebba Kalondo also issued a statement revealing that the AU agreed to postpone the DRC delegation talks. Kalondo claimed “I can confirm to you that the trip has been postponed. Not canceled.” Other African leaders, including Zimbabwe President Emmerson Mnangagwa and the leaders of Tanzania and Burundi, congratulated Tshisekdi for his victory and also recognized him as the next President as well. By January 22, the AU and EU had agreed to support Tshisekedi's Presidency as well. On January 23, the United States agreed to support the court's certification of Tshisekdi's victory and also work with the incoming DRC President's government as well.

Constitutional Court appeal
Fayulu officially filed a court case on 12 January. The Constitutional Court announced on Monday, 14 January, that it would review Fayulu's and another candidate, Theodore Ngoy's, appeal the following day. Proceedings began on 15 January and armed riot police were deployed outside the Palace of Justice in Kinshasa. Lawyers representing Fayulu have said that the poll was rigged and have urged the Constitutional Court to order a recount. A decision is due to be made by the Court on 18 January or 19 January. The Court confirmed early on 19 January to Agence France-Presse that the ruling would be made later that day. The Court ruling rejected appeals for a recount, with the verdict declaring Tshisekedi "President of the Democratic Republic of Congo by simple majority." Government spokesman Lambert Mende stated afterwards "Felix Tshisekedi will become the fifth president of the republic."

After the ruling Fayulu claimed to be the "only legitimate president" and has called for mass protests. In a statement he said "The constitutional court has just confirmed that it serves a dictatorial regime ... by validating false results, (and enabling) a constitutional coup d'etat." Fayulu also called on the international community to not recognize this result. Hundreds of Tshisekedi supporters gathered outside of the court building.

Post-court ruling
Following the ruling, on January 20 the government restored Internet access in the country, ending a 20-day shutdown of the Internet that began on 31 December 2018.

On 21 January, the day after the Constitutional Court rejected Fayulu's appeal, it became known that Tshisekedi's scheduled inauguration date (22 January) may be delayed by two days until 24 January. It was announced later that the inauguration was postponed, though no official reason was given. Police dispersed a crowd of Fayulu supporters who had gathered to hear him speak in front of his coalition's headquarters. Nevertheless, the inauguration of Tshisekedi occurred on the rescheduled date of January 24, 2019. In a speech Tshisekedi at the Palais de la Nation in Kinshasa called for a "reconciled country," and stated that "We want to build a strong Congo, turned towards its development, in peace and security – a Congo for all in which everyone has a place." On 28 January the newly elected parliament began its first session.

The overdue election for the Senate of the DRC occurred on 14 March 2019. Parties aligned with former President Kabila's Common Front for Congo (FCC) won a majority of Senate seats, giving them control of both the upper and lower house of the legislature and potentially making President Tshisekedi's attempts to reform the government more limited. The President's UPDS party won very few seats. That same month elections took place for 23 provincial governors, most of them also won by FCC candidates.

Several months into the Tshisekedi administration, by the start of May 2019 the President had not yet appointed a prime minister or a new cabinet. On 20 May, it was announced that Tshisekedi and Kabila had reached a deal, deciding to appoint the career civil servant and Kabila ally Sylvestre Ilunga as Prime Minister. Due to the pro-Kabila parties having the majority in parliament, they have the constitutional power to nominate the candidate for the head of government. On July 27, 2019, more than six months after the election the President and the parliament came to an agreement on forming a new government, beginning Ilunga's formal nomination process for Prime Minister. Ilunga's new cabinet will include 65 members, of which 42 will go to FCC candidates. Notably, the ministries of Defense, Justice, and Finance will be controlled by the Kabila coalition.

References

External links

Democratic Republic of the Congo general election
General election
Democratic Republic of the Congo general election
2018
Elections in the Democratic Republic of the Congo
Presidential elections in the Democratic Republic of the Congo